The Widening Gyre may refer to the first line of the poem by Irish poet W. B. Yeats "The Second Coming".

The Widening Gyre may also refer to:

In games

 "The Widening Gyre", a steampunk setting for the Hero System, 6th Edition by Bill Keyes, published in 2011, and Savage Worlds, published in 2014 by Blackwyrm Publishing

In literature and publications

 Batman: The Widening Gyre, a 2009 Batman limited series from Kevin Smith
 The Widening Gyre (novel), a 1983 novel by Robert B. Parker
 The Widening Gyre, a 2019 Science Fiction novel by Michael R. Johnston

In music

 The Widening Gyre, the second symphony by composer Anthony Ritchie
 "The Widening Gyre", a piece on Idiot Flesh's 1990 album Tales of Instant Knowledge and Sure Death
 The Widening Gyre, a 2015 studio album by Irish folk music band Altan

In television

 "The Widening Gyre", the 40th episode of the animated series Ben 10: Ultimate Alien.
 "The Widening Gyre", an episode in the second series of the TV show Andromeda.
 "The Widening Gyre", an episode in the third season of the TV show Sons of Anarchy.
 "The Widening Gyre", an episode in the final season of the TV show Haven.

See also
 Gyre